Aiterhofen is a municipality in the district of Straubing-Bogen in Bavaria, Germany.

It is located about 5 km southeast of Straubing in the Gäuboden.

History
Aiterhofen is settled since the Neolithic as the discovery of the biggest cemetery of the Linear Pottery culture in Germany (about 260 tombs) showed.

In 773, Aiterhofen (Eitraha) is documented as residence of one of the Agilolfing Dukes. Around 973, another documentation as Eitarahoue (Farmyard at the Eiterach). An Annalist of the 11th century falsely interpreted the name as Farmyard of Poison (poison = pus = Eiter). The actual meaning comes from the indogermanic oid for swelling and the old high German aha for water and hof for farmyard. Therefore, the meaning of the name can be interpreted as estate at the swelling stream, which shows the reference to the Aiterach River.

Approximately in the first quarter of the 13th century, the romanic parish church St. Margaretha has been constructed. Within resides the oldest bell in lower bavaria (1325). Only the northern tower of the initially planned twin towers has been constructed. In 1883 the rococo furnishings from the 18th century have been removed. The adjacent grave yard chapel was probably constructed during the 17th century.

In 1846, Angela Fraundorfer founded the convent of the franciscans of Aiterhofen, which, among other things, is aimed at the education of girls, and is operating a kindergarten, a female-only secondary school and several other facilities.

Citizen Development
In the area of the municipality the following numbers of citizens have been counted:
1970 2.424, 1987 2.749, 2000 3.178, 2005 3.466, 2008 3.422

Politics
The mayor is Manfred Krä (CSU).
The municipals tax income was about 2.5 million €, 600.000 due to trade taxes.

Buildings
Churches
 St. Margaretha was constructed approximately in the first quarter of the 13th century. The interior of the romanic church has been converted to a baroque style in the 18th century and was redesigned to the art nouveau in the 19th century.
  St. Peter und Paul in Geltolfing. The present construction has been started by Jakob Ruesch in 1715, but a church has already been document in 1226.
 St. Johannes in Niederharthausen has been constructed in the early Gothic, but today only the choir with rib vault is preserved.
 Klosterkirche Aiterhofen, the church of the franciscan convent.

Economy and infrastructure

Economy, Agriculture and Forestry
In 1998, there were 31 agricultural, 133 crafting and 62 trading and traveling locally employed. 132 have been registered in other fields. An overall of 1.022 employees have been registered living in Aiterhofen.
There were no secondary industries and 4 construction and building industries. In 1999, 96 agricultural industries with a cultivated area of 3.517 ha, consisting of 3.431 ha agricultural crop land and 82 ha permanently grassed areas, have been recorded.

Education
In 2006, the following facilities existed:
four-grouped kindergarten „Maria Schutz“
one elementary school
Angela Fraundorfer secondary school (female only) with attached boarding school (funded by the convent of the franciscans of Aiterhofen)
vocational school for elderly care (funded by the convent of the franciscans of Aiterhofen)

References

Straubing-Bogen